The Dayton–Drake football rivalry is an American college football rivalry between the Dayton Flyers and Drake Bulldogs. The rivalry began in 1952 and the teams have meet annually since 1987.

Summary
Dayton leads the all-time series 28–9. Dayton (12) and Drake (6) have combine for 18 league titles since 1993.

The first meeting was a 34–13 Flyers win in Des Moines on September 27, 1952. The teams played a two-game series in 1973 and 1974 with Dayton winning both meetings; a 16–9 victory in Dayton on October 27, 1973 and a 21–7 win in Des Moines on September 7, 1974. All three of the games occurred while both programs were fully funded NCAA Division I "major" programs.

The schools entered into a four-game contract alternating between Dayton and Des Moines with an option for a fourth game in Dayton prior to the 1987 season. Drake had announced they would not be offering grant–in–aid scholarships for football starting with the 1986 season. Dayton had made a similar decision before the 1977 season. This created a common competitive interest for the two programs. The first game of the new contract was held on November 7, 1987, in Dayton with the fourth taking place in Dayton on October 13, 1990. The Flyers won all four games and were the more experienced team during this era; having played with the "non-scholarship" restriction for nine seasons prior to Drake's decision. Dayton finished as runners-up in the 1987 Stagg Bowl
and won the 1989 Stagg Bowl. The Flyers had also won the 1980 Stagg Bowl and finished as runners-up in the 1981 Stagg Bowl prior to renewing the series.

In late 1990 a proposal was made requiring NCAA Division I intuitions to conduct all sports at the NCAA Division I level. This included non-scholarship football. The rule change was passed in January 1991. As a result, Dayton coach Mike Kelly and Drake coach Rob Ash discussed ideas about forming a new league for NCAA Division I non-scholarship programs. They would end up joining with coaches from three other institutions (and later a fourth) to form the Pioneer Football League. Given that the league would not begin play until 1993, the series contract was renewed for another two seasons. Dayton won both meetings in 1991 and 1992; along with finishing runners-up again in the 1991 Stagg Bowl.

The initial meeting between the rivals as members of the Pioneer Football League occurred on October 23, 1993. Dayton won the game 35–7 in route to capturing the first Pioneer Football League title. They would also be victorious the next season allowing them to share the league title. The Bulldogs defeated the Flyers 34–23 in Des Moines on October 21, 1995 for their first series victory, leading to their first Pioneer Football League title. Dayton would then win the next two games and league titles before Drake's first win in Dayton on October 10, 1998, which helped to secure the league title for the Bulldogs. Following the Bulldogs victory Dayton would go on a five-game winning streak versus Drake. The teams shared the title with Valparaiso in 2000 and the Flyers won the 1999, 2001, and 2002 league championships during that stretch.

Drake ended the Flyers five game streak on October 30, 2004, winning 13–6 in Dayton. The Bulldogs would go onto a ten win, Pioneer Football League championship season. This started a brief stretch where each team would win at the other team's home field until the Flyers won in Dayton on October 11, 2008, as part of a four-game winning steak. During the streak the Flyers won a share of the 2007, 2009, and 2010 Pioneer Football League titles. That streak was ended by a Bulldog victory in Des Moines on November 12, 2011. Leading up to the Bulldogs 2011 victory running back Pat Cashmore reflected on the 2010 game by expressing "they beat us on the last play, and we all remember that play very distinctly, and we have some bitter feelings. We don’t hate them. We respect them, but it’s a rivalry, and hopefully we can come out on top." Dayton won the next year at Welcome Stadium prior to a Drake three game streak which included the biggest upset in the series in 2015. The Bulldogs would capture a share of the 2011 and 2012 league titles.

On November 21, 2015, the Flyers came into Des Moines undefeated (10–0) in college football playing for NCAA Division I FCS playoff positioning. In a press conference before the game Flyer senior offensive lineman Zac Morgan indicated "we’re playing a good Drake team, which we’ve had problems with in the past. It’s a tough place to play, and everyone is focused, excited and recharged and ready to go." The Bulldogs would lead 21–0 at halftime and withstand a Dayton rally in the second half to prevail 27–17 on a snowy Iowa day. Following the game then head coach Rick Fox stated "Dayton is our rival, no doubt about it. There’s a lot of rivals we have in our conference, but this is the rivalry. And this is for all the Drake football alumni out there. To beat Dayton is sweet, and to end their unbeaten year is sweet, and to do it here at home on senior day, it couldn’t be sweeter than that."

The Flyers would get revenge winning the next two seasons 35–10 and 20–10 before the Bulldogs picked up an eleven-point 2018 victory in Ohio. Dayton won the 2019 game 46–29 in Des Moines prior to the series being interrupted due to the COVID-19 pandemic. The 2020 matchup schedule for October 10 was postponed to March 27 and later canceled (declared a no-contest). Dayton would win the 2021 game following the COVID-19 pandemic interruption 28–10 at Drake Stadium.

Game results

°October 10, 2020 - Canceled/No-Contest due to COVID-19.

See also
 List of NCAA college football rivalry games

References

College football rivalries in the United States
Dayton Flyers football
Drake Bulldogs football